The domain name .cyou is a generic top-level domain (gTLD) in the Domain Name System of the Internet. Added in March 2015, this name is marketed as the phrase "see you."

According to IANA published reports, this domain name was initially delegated to Beijing Gamease Age Digital Technology Co., Ltd., a Beijing company, on March 31, 2015. It was transferred to ShortDot SA, a Luxembourgish company, on May 14, 2020.

Reference section 

Generic top-level domains
Internet properties established in 2015